Estradiol 17β-benzoate (E2-17B) is an estrogen and an estrogen ester—specifically, the C17β benzoate ester of estradiol—which was never marketed. It is the C17β positional isomer of the better-known and clinically used estradiol ester estradiol benzoate (estradiol 3-benzoate; Progynon-B). Estradiol 17β-benzoate was first described in the 1930s.

See also
 List of estrogen esters § Estradiol esters

References

Abandoned drugs
Benzoate esters
Estradiol esters
Prodrugs
Secondary alcohols
Synthetic estrogens